Samuel Wilder King (December 17, 1886March 24, 1959) was the eleventh Territorial Governor of Hawaii and served from 1953 to 1957. He was appointed to the office after the term of Oren E. Long. Previously, King served in the United States House of Representatives as a delegate from the Territory of Hawaii. He was a member of the Republican Party of Hawaii and was the first of native Hawaiian descent to rise to the highest office in the territory.

Education
His father James A. King (1832–1899) was a ship's master for Samuel Gardner Wilder, and later politician in the Republic of Hawaii. His mother was Charlotte Holmes Davis, daughter of part-Hawaiian Robert Grimes Davis, who descended from Oliver Holmes, Governor of Oʻahu under Kamehameha I.
King was born December 17, 1886 in Honolulu and was a subject of the Kingdom of Hawai'i. 
A devout Roman Catholic, King attended Saint Louis School, but graduated from McKinley High School. Upon graduating, King went on to study at the United States Naval Academy in Annapolis, Maryland. He entered the United States Navy as a commissioned officer where he served from 1910 to 1924. At the time of his discharge, he had attained the rank of lieutenant commander.
On March 18, 1912 he married Pauline Nawahineokalai Evans, another part-Hawaiian.

Early career
King returned to his hometown in 1925 where he entered the real estate profession. In 1932, he ran for his first public office and served for two years on the Board of Supervisors of Honolulu. In 1934, King was elected to the United States Congress as a delegate. He served in Washington, D.C. from January 1935 to January 1943.
With the outbreak of World War II, King resigned from Congress to accept a naval commission to become a commander, then captain. He retired from military service in 1946.

Later career
Once again, King returned to his hometown and was appointed to a sub-cabinet office of the governor's administration. King served in the Emergency Housing Committee for a year. He was then appointed to the Hawaii Statehood Commission in 1947 where he stayed until 1953. President of the United States Dwight D. Eisenhower appointed King to the governorship that year. He was the first governor of Hawaiian ancestry. He served in ʻIolani Palace until his resignation on July 31, 1957. During his term in office he signed HB 706 on June 5, 1957 which outlawed the death penalty in Hawaii. It became Act 282.  He died in Honolulu March 24, 1959, just before Hawaii achieved statehood. He was buried in the National Memorial Cemetery of the Pacific.

Descendants
His son Samuel Pailthorpe King (1916–2010) became a lawyer and Federal Judge. His grandson, Samuel Pailthorpe King, Jr. also became a lawyer and in 1985 established his own law practice with his wife, Adrienne King, also a lawyer, as King and King, Attorneys-At-Law. His great-grandson, Samuel Wilder King II, is also a lawyer now practicing in Honolulu, and in 2015, he named his own son Samuel Wilder King III.

Legacy
In 2018, King was the subject of the short documentary Samuel Wilder King: Hawaii Statehood directed by Carolina Gratianne and produced by Daniel Bernardi with the collaboration of El Dorado Films, the Veteran Documentary Corps, and the King family.

See also
 List of Asian Americans and Pacific Islands Americans in the United States Congress
 List of minority governors and lieutenant governors in the United States

References

|-

1886 births
1959 deaths
20th-century American politicians
United States Navy personnel of World War I
United States Navy personnel of World War II
American people of Native Hawaiian descent
Delegates to the United States House of Representatives from the Territory of Hawaii
Republican Party members of the United States House of Representatives from Hawaii
Governors of the Territory of Hawaii
Hawaii Republicans
Native Hawaiian politicians
People from Honolulu
Tanager Expedition
United States Naval Academy alumni
United States Navy officers
Burials in the National Memorial Cemetery of the Pacific